The Firth of Tay is a firth on the east coast of Scotland, into which empties the River Tay (Scotland's largest river in terms of flow). The firth is surrounded by four council areas: Fife, Perth and Kinross, City of Dundee, and Angus.

Two bridges span the firth: the Tay Road Bridge and the Tay Rail Bridge. The marshy Mugdrum Island is the only major island in the firth.

The Firth of Tay in Antarctica was discovered in 1892–93 by Captain Thomas Robertson of the Dundee whaling expedition and named by him after the one in Scotland. He also named nearby Dundee Island in honour of the main city on the firth.

Natural heritage
Several parts of the firth are within a site of special scientific interest – Inner Tay Estuary, Monifieth Bay, Tayport-Tentsmuir Coast. The Invergowrie Bay section of the firth is a local nature reserve.

The Firth of Tay is noted for its extensive sand and mudflats, its population of common seals, and its wintering birds (such as oystercatcher, bar-tailed godwit, shelduck and velvet scoter). There is good access to much of the shoreline, and the firth offers many good wildlife-watching opportunities.

The reed bed on the north shore of the inner estuary in the firth is about 15 km long; it is thought to be the most extensive reedbed in Britain.

Towns and villages along the coast
Balmerino
Broughty Ferry
Dundee
Invergowrie
Kingoodie
Monifieth
Newburgh
Newport-on-Tay
Tayport
Woodhaven
Wormit

Places of interest
Balmerino Abbey
Broughty Castle Museum
Mugdrum Island
Tay Rail Bridge
Tay Road Bridge
Tentsmuir Forest
Tentsmuir National Nature Reserve

References

Tay
Bodies of water of the North Sea
River Tay
Ramsar sites in Scotland
Landforms of Perth and Kinross
Landforms of Fife
Landforms of Dundee
Landforms of Angus, Scotland